Carkeel is a hamlet north of Saltash in southeast Cornwall, England.

Surrounding area 
Carkeel Roundabout is the first roundabout road users reach when arriving in Cornwall if travelling from Plymouth across the Tamar Bridge on the A38. The A388 road connects Carkeel to the north of the county. Carkeel is just under a mile from the village of Botus Fleming and also close to the hamlet of Hatt.

To the immediate south of the hamlet is an industrial and retail estate which includes a large branch of Waitrose, a B & M store and the Tamar Tyre Centre. There are also services including a Travelodge and a BP service station, together with branches of Burger King, Greggs and Subway.

To the north of the hamlet, along Callington Road, is Tamar View Nurseries, together with a number of other shops.

To the west lies Treledan housing Estate, a mixed housing development currently being constructed by Barratt and David Wilson homes on the Broadmoor farm site. Outline planning permission for this development was granted in 2014. The developer's initial planning application in September 2019 was refused by Cornwall Council in April 2020, principally by reason of: its cramped and over-intensive layout; its car and parking-dominated nature; its insufficient provision of pedestrian/cycle routes away from cars; its failure to incorporate existing green infrastructure assets; the failure of its housing provision and distribution to be tenure neutral; the poor level of residential amenity, including lack of privacy, that would be provided for some of the private gardens; its failure to respond to local character, or to be otherwise locally distinctive; the inadequacy of its approach to the issues of climate change and biodiversity; and its harmful impact on the setting of a listed building would represent poor design and fail to create a successful, well-integrated, sustainable, socially cohesive place.

In June 2021 a revised planning application by the developers was granted permission by Cornwall Council despite minimal changes from the 2019 application and multiple objections from local residents.

Recreation 
In early 2018 plans were approved by Cornwall Council to build a large retail park on the opposite side of Carkeel Roundabout from the existing industrial estate. Building work began in August 2018 and it is anticipated that 165 jobs for local people will be created at planned branches of McDonald's, Costa Coffee, Home Bargains and an Iceland.

References

Hamlets in Cornwall